Peter Ordzovenský (born 1 November 1985) is a Slovak professional ice hockey defenceman currently playing for HK Spišská Nová Ves of the Slovak Extraliga.

Career
Ordzovenský began his career with HK Spišská Nová Ves, playing in their various Jr. teams between 2003 and 2005. After that he played for their senior team.

Ordzovenský previously played for HSC Csíkszereda, HK Nitra and HC Nové Zámky.

Career statistics

Regular season and playoffs

References

External links

 

1985 births
Living people
Slovak ice hockey defencemen
HK Nitra players
HC Nové Zámky players
Sportspeople from Spišská Nová Ves
HK Spišská Nová Ves players
HSC Csíkszereda players
Slovak expatriate ice hockey people
Slovak expatriate sportspeople in Romania
Expatriate ice hockey players in Romania